Abram "Abe" Dreyer Cohen (October 25, 1924 – February 2, 2016) was an American Olympic foil, epee, and sabre fencer.

Cohen was born in Brooklyn, New York, and was Jewish. His brother Herb Cohen competed at the 1961 Maccabiah Games in Israel, won the NCAA foil championship in 1961-62, won a bronze medal in individual foil and a gold medal with the US foil team at the 1963 Pan American Games, was Amateur Fencers League of America (AFLA) foil champion in 1964, and fenced individual and team foil for the United States in the 1964 Summer Olympics.

Fencing career
He fenced for the Fencers Club in New York. 
In college, in 1948 he was a member of the NCAA Champion CCNY team.

In 1955 and 1956 he won the epee AAU/Amateur Fencers League of America (AFLA) United States National Fencing Championship.

He won the silver medal in the 1955 Pan American Games team épée with Dick Dyer, Skip Shurtz, and Harold Goldsmith.

Cohen competed in the team épée and sabre events at the 1956 Summer Olympics in Melbourne.

He was the AFLA President’s 3-Weapon Champion in 1955 and 1956 and the winner of the 1957 and 1958 Giorgio Santelli Masters’ Sabre.

He is a member of the US Fencing Hall of Fame (inducted in 2005), and the CCNY Athletic Hall of Fame (inducted in 1971).

See also
 List of USFA Division I National Champions

References

External links
 

1924 births
2016 deaths
American male foil fencers
American male épée fencers
Olympic fencers of the United States
Fencers at the 1956 Summer Olympics
Sportspeople from Brooklyn
Pan American Games medalists in fencing
Pan American Games silver medalists for the United States
City College of New York alumni
CCNY Beavers fencers
Jewish American sportspeople
Jewish male épée fencers
Jewish male foil fencers
Jewish male sabre fencers
Fencers at the 1955 Pan American Games
21st-century American Jews
American male sabre fencers
Medalists at the 1955 Pan American Games